Raymond Keith Gilyard (born 1952 in New York City) is a writer and American professor of English who teaches and researches in the fields of rhetoric, composition, literacy studies, sociolinguistics, and African American literature.  Interested in the complex interplay among race, ethnicity, language, writing, and politics, his primary interest lies in identifying intersections of African American English and composing practices. Advocating African American English as a legitimate discourse, Gilyard has been a prominent voice in the movement to recognize ethnic and cultural discourses other than Standard English as valid. As a literary scholar and creative writer, his interests have been in the interplay among African American literature, rhetorical criticism, and bio-critical work.

Education 
Gilyard received his Bachelor of Science degree from the City University CUNY Baccalaureate Program (1974), his Master of Fine Arts from Columbia University (1979), and his doctorate (EdD) from New York University (1985), this last degree under the mentorship of Gordon M. Pradl. His first college teaching appointment was at LaGuardia Community College in 1980. In 1981, Gilyard became a faculty member at Medgar Evers College of the City University of New York, where in 1986 he helped to launch the National Black Writers Conference series. He continued at Medgar Evers as a teacher and writing program administrator until 1993, when he took a position as professor of writing and English at Syracuse University. He directed Syracuse University's writing program from 1995-1999. Since 1999, he has been on the faculty of Penn State University, where he currently serves as the Edwin Erle Sparks Professor of English and African American Studies.

Career 
Throughout his career, Gilyard has been actively involved in the National Council of Teachers of English (NCTE), including serving on the editorial board and the executive committee, and he served as NCTE president in 2011-2012 during its centennial. He has also worked significantly with the Conference on College Composition and Communication (CCCC), the world's largest professional organization for researching and teaching composition, for which he served as Chair in 2000.

Also notable among Gilyard's professional accomplishments are his receipt of two American Book Awards (1992) for his monographs Voices of the Self: A Study of Language Competence (1991) and John Oliver Killens: A Life of Black Literary Activism (2010); Faculty Honoree, City University of New York (1993); the Penn State Class of 1933 Medal of Distinction in the Humanities (2005); the Penn State Faculty Scholar Medal for Outstanding Achievement in the Arts and Humanities (2006); Honor Book Award from the Black Caucus of the American Library Association (2011); CCCC Exemplar Award (2013); NCTE Advancement of People of Color Leadership Award (2014); the Assembly of the State of New York Proclamation for Career Achievement  (2015); and the NCTE Distinguished Service Award (2018).

Publications
Gilyard's publications are substantial, including scholarly monographs and articles, autobiographical studies, a biography, textbooks, and creative works. His major publications include the following:

Scholarly monographs
Composition and Cornel West: Notes Toward a Deep Democracy (Southern Illinois University Press, 2008);
Conversations in Cultural Rhetoric and Composition Studies (with Victor Taylor) (The Davies Group, Publishers, 2009);
John Oliver Killens: A Life of Black Literary Activism (University of Georgia Press, 2010);
Let's Flip the Script: An African American Discourse on Language, Literature, and Learning (Wayne State University Press, 1996);
Liberation Memories: The Rhetoric and Poetics of John Oliver Killens (Wayne State University Press, 2003);
True to the Language Game: African American Discourse, Cultural Politics, and Pedagogy (Routledge, 2011);
Voices of the Self: A Study of Language Competence (Wayne State University Press, 1991)

Creative Writing
"The Next Great Old-School Conspiracy: A Novella" (Blind Beggar Press, 2016)
"Wing of Memory: Poems" (Whirlwind Press, 2015)
American 40 (Eclipse III, 1993)
How I Figure: Poems (Whirlwind Press, 2003)
Poemographies (Whirlwind Press, 2001)

Textbooks and edited collections
 African American Literature, ed. with Anissa Wardi (Longman, 2004)
Race, Rhetoric, and Composition, ed. (Heinemann, 1999)
Reflections on a Gift of Watermelon Pickle . . . and Other Modern Verse, 2nd ed., ed. with Stephen Dunning, Edward Lueders, Naomi Shihab Nye, and Demetrice A. Worley (Scott Foresman 1995)
Rhetoric and Ethnicity, ed. with Vorris Nunley (Heinemann, 2004)
Rhetorical Choices: A Reader for Writers, 2nd ed., ed. with Deborah Holdstein and Chuck Schuster (Longman, 2007. [1st ed. 2004])
Spirit & Flame: An Anthology of Contemporary African American Poetry, ed. (Syracuse University Press, 1997)
The Odyssey Reader, ed. with Nance Hahn and Faith Plvan (Kendall/Hunt, 1997)

Biography
Louise Thompson Patterson: A Life of Struggle for Justice. (Duke University Press, 2017)

See also 
ECOT, Charter Schools, and Voucher Programs in Ohio  
Gilyard, Keith. Composition and Cornel West: Notes toward a Deep Democracy. Carbondale: Southern Illinois University Press, 2008.
Gilyard, Keith. Voices of the Self: A Study of Language Competence. Detroit: Wayne State UP, 1991.
McInturff, Adam. "Keith Gilyard." COMPbiblio: Leaders and Influences in Composition Theory and Practice. Allison D. Smith and Trixie G. Smith, eds. Southlake, TX: Fountainhead, 2007.
Welcome to the Department of English

References 

1952 births
Living people
American academics of English literature
Steinhardt School of Culture, Education, and Human Development alumni
American Book Award winners